Finnic tribes may refer to:

 Baltic Finns
 Volga Finns